Dalen Lee Terry (born July 12, 2002) is an American professional basketball player for the Chicago Bulls of the National Basketball Association (NBA), drafted as 18th overall pick in the first round. He played college basketball for the Arizona Wildcats. As a sophomore in 2022, he was named to the Pac-12 All-Defensive Team.

High school career
Terry is a native of Phoenix, Arizona and attended Corona del Sol High School in Tempe, Arizona where he played with teammates Alex Barcello and Saben Lee before transferring to Hillcrest Prep in Phoenix, playing alongside future Arizona basketball recruit Deandre Ayton. In two years at Hillcrest, Terry averaged 15.8 points, 7.4 rebounds, 10.3 assists, 3.7 steals, and 1.9 blocks per game.  He played his AAU basketball Compton Magic with other Pac-12 players such as Johnny Juzang, Isaiah Mobley, Evan Mobley and Onyeka Okongwu.

Recruiting
Terry was a consensus four-star recruit in the 2020 class and the No. 46 overall player, according to 247Sports. On July 23, 2019, he committed to playing college basketball for Arizona, being the first commit in the 2020 class for Arizona. Terry had offers from Arizona State, Arkansas, California, Colorado, USC, Utah and Vanderbilt, among others. He was joined in the 2020 recruiting class by Bennedict Mathurin, Ąžuolas Tubelis and Kerr Kriisa among others to give Arizona the Number 7 overall recruiting class for 2020.

College career
As a freshman at Arizona, Terry appeared in all 26 games for the Wildcats, starting 14 of them while averaging 4.6 points, 3.2 rebounds, 1.5 assists per game.  His highest point total came against in-state rival Arizona State, scoring 13 points, while shooting 3-of-3 from three-point range. Arizona would be placed on self-imposed post season ban, thus Terry would not play in the 2021 Pac-12 tournament or the 2021 NCAA tournament.

In his sophomore season, he would start all 37 games for the Wildcats, where he averaged eight points, 4.8 rebounds, 3.9 assists and 1.2 steals per game. He finished second in the Pac-12 in assist-to-turnover ratio (2.84), sixth in assists per game (3.92), eighth in FG% (50.2) and ninth in steals per game (1.24). He became one of the marquee defensive players in the conference earning him All-Defensive First Team. Terry helped Arizona to a 33–4 record, winning the 2021 Roman Main Event, Pac-12 Conference regular season and 2022 Pac-12 tournament Titles. Arizona returned to the 2022 NCAA tournament for the first time since 2018. He would score a career-high 17 points in his final game as a Wildcat against Houston. On April 22, 2022, Terry declared for the 2022 NBA draft while maintaining his college eligibility. He later decided to remain in the draft.

Professional career

Chicago Bulls (2022–present) 
Terry was selected by the Chicago Bulls with the 18th overall pick in the 2022 NBA draft.

Career statistics

College

|-
| style="text-align:left;"| 2020–21
| style="text-align:left;"| Arizona
| 26 || 14 || 20.7 || .415 || .326 || .614 || 3.2 || 1.5 || .7 || .4 || 4.6
|-
| style="text-align:left;"| 2021–22
| style="text-align:left;"| Arizona
| 37 || 37 || 27.8 || .502 || .364 || .736 || 4.8 || 3.9 || 1.2 || .3 || 8.0
|- class="sortbottom"
| style="text-align:center;" colspan="2"| Career
| 63 || 51 || 24.9 || .477 || .350 || .680 || 4.2 || 2.9 || 1.0 || .3 || 6.6

References

External links
Arizona Wildcats bio
USA Basketball bio

2002 births
Living people
American men's basketball players
Arizona Wildcats men's basketball players
Basketball players from Phoenix, Arizona
Chicago Bulls draft picks
Chicago Bulls players
Point guards
Small forwards
Windy City Bulls players